Carina Lau Kar-ling (born 8 December 1966) is a Hong Kong-Canadian actress and singer. She started her acting career in TVB, before going on to achieve success in films after her 2nd year in college. She was notable in the 1980s for her girl-next-door type roles in films. She also plays Empress Wu Zetian in Tsui Hark's Detective Dee films, starting with Detective Dee and the Mystery of the Phantom Flame in 2010. She has won Best Actress awards at the Hong Kong Film Award and Mainland China's Golden Rooster Awards, and has been nominated at Cannes Film Festival and Taiwan's Golden Horse Awards.

Her husband is Hong Kong actor Tony Leung Chiu-wai. Lau frequently appears in the Hong Kong fashion scene and is a patron of many charities.

Early life
Lau was born in Suzhou, China, in 1965. She moved to Hong Kong at the age of fifteen, and joined TVB's acting class in 1983.

Career
Lau made her on-screen debut in TVB's The Clones (1984) where she starred opposite of her future husband, Tony Leung. She gained wider recognition after a series of appearances in successful drama series such as The Duke of Mount Deer and Police Cadet and skyrocketed to fame following her role as a wealthy heiress in one of Hong Kong's most-watched ever series, Looking Back in Anger (1989).

Lau then expanded to films. She was nominated at the Hong Kong Film Award for Best Actress for her role in Her Beautiful Life Lies (1989). She received acclaim for her role in Days of Being Wild (1991), one of her many collaborations with film director Wong Kar-wai. She continued to showcase her versatility with impressive performances in the martial arts epic Saviour of the Soul (1991), the biopic Center Stage (1991), the cross-dressing comedy He's a Woman, She's a Man (1994), and the offbeat romance Gigolo and Whore (1994). Following parts in the wuxia classic Ashes of Time (1994) and James Bond pastiche Forbidden City Cop (1997), Lau once again attracted the attention of various awards juries with her measured portrayals of bisexual silk factory owner Wan in Intimates (1997) and a prostitute in the 19th Century epic Flowers of Shanghai (1998).

Her roles as Hon Sam's wife in the two Infernal Affairs sequels and an android in Wong Kar-wai's 2046 (2004) further increased Lau's international recognition. Lau then stepped in the shoes of Sarah Jessica Parker for the Hong Kong version of Sex and the City, named Sex and the Beauties (2004). She won rave reviews for her performances as unhappily-married Rose in the low-budget thriller Curiosity Kills the Cat (2006) and as Wu Zetian in the blockbuster Detective Dee and the Mystery of the Phantom Flame (2010), which earned her a Golden Rooster Award for Best Actress and a Hong Kong Film Award for Best Actress, respectively. She reprised her role as Wu Zetian in two Detective Dee prequels. She received a Best Actress nomination at the Cannes Film Festival for her role as a rich housewife abandoned by her husband in Bends (2013).

In 2016, Lau was one of the celebrities that appeared on the Chinese reality show Up Idol. Since then, she has made guest appearances in other mainland reality TV shows. In June 2017, she and her husband were invited to become a member of the Academy of Motion Picture Arts and Sciences. In 2021, she hosted Reflection, a short web series interviewing various female celebrities.

She will launch her own talk show titled the Carina Show in 2022.

Other activities
She was executive president of Hong Kong's TVMART channel, but was replaced by the board after a loss of 40 million Taiwan Dollars. She told the media that because she had no education, the decisions made by her had some negative influences on the company.

Incidents

1990 abduction
In 1990, during the filming of Days of Being Wild, Lau was abducted for several hours, and topless photos of her were taken. At the time, local papers, through Reuters news agency, reported that Lau was kidnapped, though a police report was not filed. Tony Leung Chiu-wai has said that Lau never wanted to talk about what happened in those missing hours with anyone, including him.

Lau revealed in 2008 that she was abducted by four men working for a triad boss, as "punishment" for having refused a film offer. She said that she had not been taken advantage of during her two-hour ordeal.

2002 East Week magazine photo incident
In October 2002, East Week magazine published a nude photo of an "unnamed female star" clearly in distress, with the victim's face partially blurred. The public quickly connected the photo to Lau's abduction 12 years prior.

Massive protests broke out in the following days, led by various Hong Kong entertainment guilds and citizen groups. Lau appeared in front of the crowd and she was given support from groups, but she had never directly acknowledged that she is the person in the photo. Media ethics by Hong Kong tabloids and gossip magazines were questioned. Hong Kong police became involved and East Week was forced to shut down a few days later. It eventually restarted in late 2003 under new ownership. In 2009, Mong Hanming, the chief editor of East Week at the time of the incident, received a 5-month jail sentence after pleading guilty to publishing obscene photos.

Personal life
Lau had a relationship with Hong Kong tycoon Julian Hui from 1986 to 1988. They were engaged and lived together, until Hui announced their split in April 1988. The media characterized their relationship as a failed attempt on Lau's part to marry into a wealthy family, but Lau has publicly stated that their breakup was amicable, and she remains friends with Hui and his family.

She has been in a relationship with Tony Leung Chiu-wai since 1989, after working together on a Hong Kong production of Run For Your Wife. They married on 21 July 2008, at the COMO Uma Paro hotel in Bhutan. The wedding itself cost more than HK$30 million and Lau's  Cartier wedding ring is worth over HK$10 million. Guests included singer Faye Wong, who performed for them on their special day. Hong Kong director Wong Kar-wai also directed the ceremony. The wedding created a media frenzy in Hong Kong, with companies spending hundreds of thousands of dollars to pursue the wedding party.

There have long been rumours that Leung and actress Maggie Cheung were romantically involved, ever since they starred together in the film In the Mood for Love (2000), which was a hot topic among media outlets in Greater China due to the trio's fame. The alleged feud between Lau and Cheung was put to rest in 2013 when Lau uploaded a photo of them together to social media. When asked about the rumored affair, Lau said in a 2016 interview on The Jin Xing Show that "it's just a beautiful story" and she "knows about the affair as much as the public does".

Filmography

Film

Television

Discography

Awards and nominations

References

External links

1965 births
Living people
20th-century Chinese actresses
20th-century Hong Kong actresses
21st-century Chinese actresses
21st-century Hong Kong actresses
Actresses from Jiangsu
Actresses from Suzhou
Canadian Buddhists
Canadian expatriates in Hong Kong
Canadian women singers
Canadian film actresses
Canadian people of Chinese descent
Canadian television actresses
Chinese expatriates in Hong Kong
Chinese film actresses
Chinese television actresses
EMI Records artists
Hong Kong Buddhists
Hong Kong expatriates in Canada
Hong Kong film actresses
Hong Kong Mandopop singers
Hong Kong television actresses